The Piscataway Indian Nation , also called Piscatawa , is a state-recognized tribe in Maryland that is descended from the historic Piscataway people. At the time of European encounter, the Piscataway was one of the most populous and powerful Native polities of the Chesapeake Bay region, with a territory on the north side of the Potomac River. By the early seventeenth century, the Piscataway had come to exercise hegemony over other Algonquian-speaking Native American groups on the north bank of the river. The Piscataway nation declined dramatically before the nineteenth century, under the influence of colonization, infectious disease, and intertribal and colonial warfare.

The Piscataway Indian Nation organized out of a 20th-century revival of its people and culture. Its peoples are committed to indigenous and human rights. It is one of three contemporary organized groups of the Piscataway people.

On January 12, 2012, Maryland Governor Martin O'Malley issued an Executive Order recognizing both the Piscataway Indian Nation and the Piscataway Conoy Tribe as Indian groups under a process established by the General Assembly.

Geography
The Piscataway Indian Nation inhabits traditional homelands in the areas of Charles County, Calvert County, and St. Mary's County; all in Maryland. Its people now mostly live in these three southern Maryland counties and in the two nearby major metropolitan areas, Baltimore and Washington, D.C.

Government
The most recent hereditary chief of the Piscataway Indian Nation and Tayac Territory was the late Billy Redwing Tayac, prominent in the movement for indigenous and human rights. He was the son of the late Chief Turkey Tayac, a leader in the Native American revitalization movements of the twentieth century. He died in September of 2021. 

Since Turkey Tayac's death in 1978, two other organized tribal groups have emerged that represent Piscataway people: these are the Piscataway Conoy Tribe, led by Mrs. Mervin Savoy; and the Cedarville Band of Piscataways, led by Natalie Proctor. The different tribes have varying perspectives on tribal membership, development, and other issues.

History

While indigenous peoples inhabited areas along the waterways of Maryland for thousands of years, the historic Piscataway coalesced as a tribe comprising numerous settlements sometime in the fourteenth or fifteenth century. The women were developed agriculturalists, growing varieties of maize, beans and squash that supported population and a hierarchical society.  The men also hunted and fished. A hierarchy of places and rulers emerged: hamlets without hereditary rulers paid tribute to a nearby village. Its chief, or werowance, appointed a "lesser king" to each dependent settlement. With political change came changes in social structure and religious development that exalted the hierarchy. By the end of the sixteenth century, each werowance on the north bank of the Potomac was subject to a single paramount chief: the ruler of the Piscataway, known as the Tayac.

English colonization
The English explorer Captain John Smith first visited the upper Potomac River in 1608. When the English began to colonize what is now Maryland, the Tayac made allies of the newcomers. He granted the English a former Indian settlement, which they renamed St. Mary's City, after their own monarch. The Tayac intended the new colonial outpost to serve as a buffer against Susquehannock incursions from the north. In 1634 Tayac Chitimachen or Kittamaquund converted to Christianity under the guidance of Jesuit Rev. Andrew White. His young daughter Mary, who also had converted and taken a Christian name, married the colonist Giles Brent of Maryland. Soon, the tribe was caught in English religious wars, as the Virginia Protestant trader William Claiborne and his ally Captain Ingalls, invaded Maryland and destroyed St. Mary's City as well as the rival trading post at Kent Island. Moreover, both Gov. Calvert and Kittamaquund soon died. Since neither the tribe nor the rival Maryland governments recognized Brent's claim to Piscataway lands, the couple crossed the Potomac to establish a trading post and live at Aquia Creek, Virginia.

Any benefits to having the English as allies and buffers proved short-lived. The Maryland Colony was initially too weak to pose a significant threat. But the Seneca continued to occasionally invade southward. Moreover, as the English persisted and eventually developed a more successful colony after resolving their own religious disputes, they turned against the Piscataway, competing for land and resources. Furthermore, some Piscataway had settled across the Potomac river, and became known as the Mattaponi. They became embroiled in the Anglo-Powhatan Wars.

By a 1668 treaty, western shore Algonquians agreed to be confined to two reservations: one on the Wicomico River; the other, on those settlements that comprised a portion of the Piscataway homeland. However, those reservations had not been laid out when Susquehannocks retreating from the Virginia Colony established a fort in Maryland, and the war they had been waging against English colonists flared into Bacon's Rebellion. The respite from the Treaty of Middle Plantation proved brief. Refugees from dispossessed Algonquian nations, including the Mattaponi (who had their own small reservation in Virginia), joined with the Piscataway, who by 1690 had retreated into Zekiah Swamp.

In 1697, many Piscataway relocated across the Potomac and camped near what is now Plains, Virginia in Fauquier County. This alarmed Virginia settlers, who tried to persuade the Piscataway to return to Maryland. Finally in 1699, the tribe moved on its own accord to what is now called Conoy Island in the Potomac River near Point of Rocks, Maryland. They settled there until after 1722.

In the eighteenth century, some Piscataway, as well as Lenape and other fleeing Algonquian groups, migrated northwest toward the Susquehanna River seeking relief from the European settlers. Then known as the "Conoy", they sought the protection of the powerful Haudenosaunee, their former enemies, as well as German Christians including Conrad Weiser. They were allowed to establish settlements, including at Conoy Creek near Conestoga Town in Lancaster County, Pennsylvania and Shamokin in Northumberland County, Pennsylvania.

However, by the American Revolutionary War, the Pennsylvania Colony also proved unsafe, for while the Tuscarora and Oneida sided with the Americans, other Iroquois tribes sided with the British. American Colonel Thomas Hartley in 1778 and Sullivan's Expedition in 1779-1780 devastated Native American towns. Some Conoy continued to migrate north, along the Great Indian Warpath, Great Shamokin Path, Sheshequin Path and other trails, finally settling in New France. Today, their descendants live with the Six Nations of the Grand River First Nation, in Ontario, Canada. Others may have moved south toward North Carolina Colony with the Tuscarora (despite their Iroquoian language) or Occaneechi (despite their Siouian language), and possibly merged with the Meherrin or Pamunkey.

Present day
According to some historians and archaeologists, a small group of Piscataway families continued to live in their homeland. Though destroyed as an independent, sovereign polity, the Piscataway survived, and resettled into rural farm life. In those times, they were classified as free people of color, over time marrying members of other ethnic groups, but incorporating them into some Piscataway traditions.

In the late nineteenth century, archaeologists, journalists, and anthropologists interviewed a number of Piscataway who claimed descent from tribes associated with the old Piscataway chiefdom. Unlike other institutions, the Catholic Church continued to identify a core group of families as Indian in its parish records. Anthropologists and sociologists classified many as a tri-racial folk community, who were commonly called "Wesorts".

Phillip Sheridan Proctor, later known as Turkey Tayac, was born in 1895 in Charles County, Maryland. Proctor revived the use of the title, tayac, a hereditary office he claimed had been handed down through his family. Turkey Tayac was instrumental in the revival of American Indian cultures in the Mid-Atlantic and Southeast.

By the early twentieth century, few families identified themselves as Piscataway Indians, with dramatic decreases in population due to disease, as well as the Maryland Colony's dissolution of reservations in the eighteenth century. Furthermore, the prevailing racial attitudes during the eighteenth and nineteenth centuries, became Jim Crow policies of the twentieth century—based on a binary society. With the early 20th-century pseudoscience of Walter Plecker and others came laws enforcing the "one-drop rule". Thus, anyone with a discernible amount of African ancestry was commonly classified as "negro", "mulatto", or "black", regardless of their self-identification. The Piscataway were reclassified as "free people of color", "Free Negro" or "mulatto" on state and federal census records even in the nineteenth century, and under Plecker's lobbying, the mulatto category was eliminated by the mid-20th century. This detribalization made standing American Indian treaty rights that much easier to abrogate for multi-racial people, even though Catholic, Baptist or other parish records and  ethnographic reports continued to identify Piscataway individuals and families as Indians.

Piscataway revival
Chief Turkey Tayac was a prominent figure in the early and mid-twentieth century cultural revitalization movements. He influenced the Piscataway, but also other remnant southeastern American Indian communities, such as the Lumbee of North Carolina, and the Nanticoke, and Powhatan of Virginia and Maryland. With a third-grade formal education, Chief Turkey Tayac began the process of cultural revitalization and self-determination. He emphasized a movement based on American Indians choosing self-identification, during an era when the United States Indian Reorganization Act required individuals to prove blood quantum to claim their ancestry.

Today, the Piscataway Indian Nation is an emergent sovereign indigenous presence in its Chesapeake homeland. The Piscataway Indian tribal nation is enjoying a renaissance. 

The Piscataway Indian Nation members are among the 25,000 self-identified Native Americans in Maryland.

References

Sources
Barbour, Philip L. The Three Worlds of Captain John Smith. Boston: Houghton Mifflin Co., 1964.
__. ed. The Jamestown Voyages Under the First Charter, 1606-1609. 2 vols. The Hakluyt Society, 2nd series nos. 136-137. Cambridge, England, 1969.
Chambers, Mary E. and Robert L. Humphrey. Ancient Washington—American Indian Cultures of the Potomac Valley. Washington, D.C., George Washington University, 1977.
Goddard, Ives (1978). "Eastern Algonquian Languages". In Bruce Trigger (ed.), Handbook of North American Indians, Vol. 15 (Northeast). Washington, DC: Smithsonian Institution, pp. 70–77.
Griffin, James B. "Eastern North American Prehistory: A Summary". Science 156 (1967):175-191.
Hertzberg, Hazel. The Search for an American Indian Identity: Modern Pan Indian Movements. NY: Syracuse University Press, 1971.
Merrell, James H. "Cultural Continuity Among the Piscataway Indians of Colonial Maryland". William & Mary Quarterly, 3rd series, 36 (1979): 548-70.
Potter, Stephen R. Commoners, Tribute, and Chiefs: The Development of Algonquian Culture in the Potomac Valley. Charlottesville: University Press of Virginia, 1993.

Native American tribes in Maryland
African–Native American relations
Algonquian ethnonyms
Charles County, Maryland
Piscataway tribe
State-recognized tribes in the United States